Ricky James Young (born 25 April 1978) is an English actor, dancer, and producer. His early work includes the miniseries Children of Dune (2003) and the films Is Harry on the Boat? (2001) and Beowulf (2007). More recently, he is known for his roles in the youth series Find Me in Paris (2018–2020) and Theodosia (2022).

Early life
Young grew up in Hythe, a suburb of Southampton. His mother Helen is a dance instructor and his sister Rachel is a Utrecht-based comedian. He began working with professional ballet companies from the age of fifteen. He went on to train at the Guildhall School of Music and Drama, graduating in 2000.

Filmography

Film

Television

Stage

References

External links

Living people
1978 births
Alumni of the Guildhall School of Music and Drama
English male ballet dancers
English Shakespearean actors
Male actors from Southampton